Argentina participated at the 2010 Summer Youth Olympics in Singapore and competed with 59 athletes in 18 sports.

Medalists

Athletics

Boys
Track and road events

Field events

Girls

Track and road events

Field events

Basketball

Boys

Group stage

Quarterfinals

5th-8th place

7th-8th place

Boxing

Canoeing

Girls

Cycling

Cross country

Time Trial

BMX

Road race

Overall

Equestrian

Fencing

Group stage

Knock-out stage

Gymnastics

Artistic gymnastics

Girls

Trampoline

Field hockey

Group stage

Gold-medal match

Judo

Individual

Team

Rowing

Sailing

Boys

Girls

Swimming

Table tennis

Individual

Team

Taekwondo

Boys

Tennis

Triathlon

Men's

Mixed

Volleyball

Group stage

|}

Semi-finals

|}

Gold-medal match

|}

Day-by-day 

15 August

 Rowing – Boys' single sculls heats (Facundo Torres)
 Taekwondo – Boys' quarterfinal; Lucas Guzman against Vittorio Rega  vs. 
 Taekwondo – Boys' semifinal; Lucas Guzman against Gili Haimovitz  vs. 
 Tennis – Girls' singles round of 32; Agustina Sol Eskenazi against Jana Čepelová  vs. 

16 August

 Basketball – Boys' team group stage  vs. 
 Hockey – Girls' team group stage  vs. 
 Rowing – Boys' single sculls repechage (Facundo Torres)
 Swimming – Boys' 100 metre butterfly heats (Roberto Strelkov)
 Swimming – Boys' 100 metre butterfly semifinal (Roberto Strelkov)
 Tennis – Boys' singles round of 32; Renzo Olivo against Ricardo Rodriguez  vs. 
 Tennis – Boys' doubles round of 16; Renzo Olivo and Tiago Fernandes against Peter Heller and Kevin Krawietz / vs /
 Triathlon – Boys' individual race final (Lautaro Diaz)

17 August

 Athletics – Boys' 3000 metre qualification (Federico Bruno)
 Cycling – Girls' cross country final (Verena Brunner)
 Cycling – Boys' cross country final (Kevin Ingratta)
 Cycling – Boys' time trial final (Facundo Lezica)
 Basketball – Boys' team group stage  vs. 
 Fencing – Girls' individual épée pool round; Clara Isabel Di Tella against Amy Radford  vs. 
 Fencing – Girls' individual épée pool round; Clara Isabel Di Tella against Hye Won Lee  vs. 
 Fencing – Girls' individual épée pool round; Clara Isabel Di Tella against Wanda Matshaya  vs. 
 Fencing – Girls' individual épée pool round; Clara Isabel Di Tella against Yulia Bakhareva  vs. 
 Fencing – Girls' individual épée pool round; Clara Isabel Di Tella against Amalia Tataran  vs. 
 Fencing – Girls' individual épée round of 16; Clara Isabel Di Tella against Alberta Santuccio  vs. 
 Gymnastics (artistic) – Girls' qualification (Agustina Estarli)
 Hockey – Girls' team group stage  vs. 
 Sailing – Boys' windsurfing Techno 293 (Bautista Saubidet Birkner) Race 1
 Sailing – Boys' windsurfing Techno 293 (Bautista Saubidet Birkner) Race 2
 Sailing – Boys' one-person dinghy Byte CII (Juan Ignacio Biava) Race 1
 Sailing – Boys' one-person dinghy Byte CII (Juan Ignacio Biava) Race 2
 Sailing – Girls' windsurfing Techno 293 (Valentina Serigos) Race 1
 Sailing – Girls' windsurfing Techno 293 (Valentina Serigos) Race 2
 Swimming – Boys' 50 metre freestyle heats (Roberto Strelkov)
 Swimming – Boys' 50 metre freestyle semifinal (Roberto Strelkov)
 Swimming – Girls' 100 metre breaststroke heats (Mijal Asis)
 Tennis – Boys' singles consolidation first round; Renzo Olivo against Jason Patrombon  vs. 
 Tennis – Boys' doubles quarterfinals; Renzo Olivo and Tiago Fernandes against Diego Galeano and Ricardo Rodriguez / vs /

18 August

 Athletics – Boys' long jump qualification (Leandro Monje Cerino)
 Athletics – Girls' high jump qualification (Betsabe Paez)
 Athletics – Boys' Javelin Qualification (Braian Toledo)
 Basketball – Boys' team group stage  vs. 
 Equestrian – Team's jumping round 1 (Maria Victoria Paz)
 Sailing – Boys' windsurfing Techno 293 (Bautista Saubidet Birkner) Race 3
 Sailing – Boys' windsurfing Techno 293 (Bautista Saubidet Birkner) Race 4
 Sailing – Boys' one-person dinghy Byte CII (Juan Ignacio Biava) Race 3
 Sailing – Boys' one-person dinghy Byte CII (Juan Ignacio Biava) Race 4
 Sailing – Girls' windsurfing Techno 293 (Valentina Serigos) Race 3
 Sailing – Girls' windsurfing Techno 293 (Valentina Serigos) Race 4

19 August

 Athletics – Girls' 400 metre H qualification heats (Belen Casetta)
 Cycling – Boys' BMX seeding phase (Lucas Bustos)
 Basketball – Boys' team group stage  vs. 
 Hockey – Girls' team group stage  vs. 
 Swimming – Boys' 100 metre freestyle heats (Roberto Strelkov)
 Triathlon – Mixed race final (Lautaro Diaz)

20 August

 Equestrian – Team's jumping round 2 final (Maria Victoria Paz)
 Gymnastics (trampoline) – Boys' first routine (Lucas Adorno)
 Gymnastics (trampoline) – Boys' second routine (Lucas Adorno)
 Hockey – Girls' team group stage  vs. 
 Sailing – Boys' windsurfing Techno 293 (Bautista Saubidet Birkner) Race 5
 Sailing – Boys' windsurfing Techno 293 (Bautista Saubidet Birkner) Race 6
 Sailing – Boys' windsurfing Techno 293 (Bautista Saubidet Birkner) Race 7
 Sailing – Boys' one-person dinghy Byte CII (Juan Ignacio Biava) Race 5
 Sailing – Boys' one-person dinghy Byte CII (Juan Ignacio Biava) Race 6
 Sailing – Boys' one-person dinghy Byte CII (Juan Ignacio Biava) Race 7
 Sailing – Girls' windsurfing Techno 293 (Valentina Serigos) Race 5
 Sailing – Girls' windsurfing Techno 293 (Valentina Serigos) Race 6
 Sailing – Girls' windsurfing Techno 293 (Valentina Serigos) Race 7
 Swimming – Girls' 200 metre breaststroke heats (Mijal Asis)

21 August

 Basketball – Boys' team quarterfinals  vs. 
 Canoeing – Girls' head-to-head canoe sprint K-1 time trial (Valentina Barrera)
 Sailing – Boys' windsurfing Techno 293 (Bautista Saubidet Birkner) Race 8
 Sailing – Boys' windsurfing Techno 293 (Bautista Saubidet Birkner) Race 9
 Sailing – Boys' windsurfing Techno 293 (Bautista Saubidet Birkner) Race 10
 Sailing – Boys' one-person dinghy Byte CII (Juan Ignacio Biava) Race 8
 Sailing – Boys' one-person dinghy Byte CII (Juan Ignacio Biava) Race 9
 Sailing – Boys' one-person dinghy Byte CII (Juan Ignacio Biava) Race 10
 Sailing – Girls' windsurfing Techno 293 (Valentina Serigos) Race 8
 Sailing – Girls' windsurfing Techno 293 (Valentina Serigos) Race 9
 Sailing – Girls' windsurfing Techno 293 (Valentina Serigos) Race 10
 Volleyball – Boys' team group stage  vs. 

22 August

 Athletics – Boys' 3000 metre final B (Federico Bruno)
 Athletics – Boys' long jump final B (Leandro Monje Cerino)
 Athletics – Boys' javelin final (Braian Toledo)
 Athletics – Girls' high jump final (Betsabe Paez)
 Basketball – Boys' team 5th–8th place  vs. 
 Equestrian – Jumping individual round A (Maria Victoria Paz)
 Hockey – Girls' team group stage  vs. 
 Volleyball – Boys' team group stage  vs. 

23 August

 Athletics – Girls' 400 metre H Final B (Belen Casetta)
 Judo – Boys' -100 kg round of 32
 Sailing – Boys' windsurfing Techno 293 (Bautista Saubidet Birkner) Race 11
 Sailing – Boys' windsurfing Techno 293 (Bautista Saubidet Birkner) Race 12
 Sailing – Boys' one-person dinghy Byte CII (Juan Ignacio Biava) Race 11
 Sailing – Boys' one-person dinghy Byte CII (Juan Ignacio Biava) Race 12
 Sailing – Girls' windsurfing Techno 293 (Valentina Serigos) Race 11
 Sailing – Girls' windsurfing Techno 293 (Valentina Serigos) Race 12

24 August

 Equestrian – Jumping individual round B final (Maria Victoria Paz)
 Canoeing – Girls' K-1 obstacle canoe slalom time trial (Valentina Barrera)
 Sailing – Boys' windsurfing Techno 293 (Bautista Saubidet Birkner) Race 13
 Sailing – Boys' windsurfing Techno 293 (Bautista Saubidet Birkner) Race 14
 Sailing – Boys' windsurfing Techno 293 (Bautista Saubidet Birkner) Race 15
 Sailing – Boys' one-person dinghy Byte CII (Juan Ignacio Biava) Race 13
 Sailing – Boys' one-person dinghy Byte CII (Juan Ignacio Biava) Race 14
 Sailing – Boys' one-person dinghy Byte CII (Juan Ignacio Biava) Race 15
 Sailing – Girls' windsurfing Techno 293 (Valentina Serigos) Race 13
 Sailing – Girls' windsurfing Techno 293 (Valentina Serigos) Race 14
 Sailing – Girls' windsurfing Techno 293 (Valentina Serigos) Race 15

25 August

 Equestrian – Jumping individual final (Maria Victoria Paz)
 Sailing – Boys' windsurfing Techno 293 (Bautista Saubidet Birkner) Race 16 final
 Sailing – Boys' one-person dinghy Byte CII (Juan Ignacio Biava) Race 16 final
 Sailing – Girls' windsurfing Techno 293 (Valentina Serigos) Race 16 final

References

External links
Competitors List: Argentina

2010 in Argentine sport
Nations at the 2010 Summer Youth Olympics
Argentina at the Youth Olympics